Adil Ahmad Khan (born 7 July 1988), is an Indian professional footballer who plays as a defender or defensive midfielder for Indian Super League club Hyderabad and the India national team.

Club career

Sporting Goa
A product of the Sesa Football Academy, Adil Khan started his football career in SESA in 2003 where he played for 5 years before moving to Sporting Goa in 2008. He would spend 5 years at Sporting, playing for them in various positions, primarily in full back and centre midfield, first in the I-League 2nd Division and later in the I-League for 5 years and scoring 12 goals.

Mohun Bagan
Khan signed for century-old Kolkata-based club Mohun Bagan on a one-year deal for the 2013–14 season. He made his debut for Bagan in the I-League on 22 October 2013 against Bengaluru at the Bangalore Football Stadium as Bagan drew the match 1–1. He would go on to make only 6 more appearances and was used primarily as a squad player.

Delhi Dynamos
Adil Khan represented Delhi Dynamos in the 2014 Indian Super League where he played as a right back and appeared in 7 matches  but could not help his team qualify for the semi-finals.

Bharat
He joined the newly formed I-League team Bharat for the 2014–15 season but prior to the season beginning, endured a season-ending injury. Initially, he chose not to have an operation but the result was missing out on the entire season where his team finished last and was later disbanded. He would eventually undergo surgery in the off-season.

Lonestar Kashmir
After recovering from the injury he sustained while with Bharat, Khan signed with I-League 2nd Division side Lonestar Kashmir on a 3-month deal to play in the 2015–16 season. He would feature for his team in the group stage and later in the final round but could only help his team finish 6th and last in the final round after qualifying form the group.

Dempo
After finishing the season with Lonestar Kashmir, he signed a short-term deal with Dempo to play in the Goa Professional League, a state level tournament. His team however, did not participate in the top-tier I-League during the season.

Churchill Brothers
Adil signed for the newly re-instated I-League club Churchill Brothers for the 2016–17 I-League season. He re-invented himself as a centre back and appeared 18 times for Churchill in a fairly successful season as a starting centre back as his team finished 6th.

Pune City
Khan signed for two years with Pune City, where he primarily played as a centre back across the 2017–18 season and 2018–19 season.

Hyderabad
Adil signed for Hyderabad in September 2019 for the 2019–20 season. In January 2020, Hyderabad FC extended his contract for three years.

Goa (loan)
On 22 January 2021, Adil Khan joined Goa on loan for the duration of the 2020–21 season. He made his debut for Goa on 29 January against SC East Bengal.

SC East Bengal (loan)
In 2021, He joined  SC East Bengal on loan for the duration of the 2021–22 season.

International
Khan made his senior international debut against Azerbaijan for India on 27 February 2012. He Scored the only goal for India in 1–1 draw against Bangladesh in the 2022 World Cup Qualifiers, at Salt Lake Stadium.

Personal life
On 23 April 2019, he married his girlfriend and Star Sports anchor Khuri Irani. She mainly presents Indian Super League.

Career statistics

Club

International

International goals
Scores and results list India's goal tally first

Honours

India
 King's Cup third place: 2019

References

External links

Indian footballers
1988 births
Living people
I-League players
I-League 2nd Division players
India international footballers
Sporting Clube de Goa players
Mohun Bagan AC players
Bharat FC players
Indian Super League players
Odisha FC players
Lonestar Kashmir F.C. players
Dempo SC players
Association football midfielders
Hyderabad FC players
Footballers from Goa
Churchill Brothers FC Goa players
FC Pune City players
FC Goa players